Labus, Lábus or  Labuś is a surname of Slavic origin. Notable people with this surname include:

Goran Labus, Serbian football goalkeeper
Jiří Lábus
Ladislav Lábus
Miroljub Labus, Yugoslavian and Serbian politician and economist
Pepa Lábus (born in 1968), Czech singer-songwriter.